CNEP may refer:

National Centre for the Evaluation of Photoprotection
Comptoir national d'escompte de Paris